Henry Scharbau (1822–1902), or Henry Sharbau, was a British cartographer remembered for his work in Japan as an Oyatoi foreign advisor in the Meiji era.

Biography

Scharbau was born at Lübeck in North Germany in 1822, but came to England in his youth. Due to his skills in surveying and draughtsmanship, firstly in work on the Ordnance Survey of the south of Scotland, and between 1858 and 1864 in the Admiralty Surveys in the Hebrides and some western lochs. In 1865 he was appointed temporary assistant in the Hydrographic Office, a post he held until 1874. In 1873, Scharbau became a naturalized British subject and he received an invitation from the Japanese government to work as an assistant and advisor of the Surveying Department in the Ministry of Interior.
Scharbau went to Japan in 1873 to teach triangulation in Japan from November 1, 1873. Scharbau travelled with McVean and John Francis Campbell to Nikko in November 1874, surveying 'Jeddo'. Scharbau set up a surveying base on Mt. Asama with British colleagues in October 1875. In April 1876, he went out with a Japanese surveying engineer to set up a base around Nikko along the Ushū Kaidō, passing through Utsunomiya and Imaichi. Between 1874 and 1876 'シャボー' kept a diary of these travels which are now housed in Skaill House in Orkney. Intriguingly he stuck to European customs in his time in Japan, eating from the estimable firm of Crosse & Blackwell. He left Japan at the end of October 1876.

In 1877 he worked as a draughtsman for the Home Office until his work as chief draughtsman under the Royal Geographical Society in April 1881. One notable map Scharbau created a Lithographic map of Tibet, compiled from his own and traveller accounts under the superintendence of General Walker, and first published by the Society in 1894. In 1902 his wife died, and Scharbau would die the same year.

References

External links
Scharbau's Journey to Nikko, (1874 - 1876)
Scharbau maps at LOC.gov
Surveying Meiji Japan - Henry Scharbau and the Skaill House Journals

1822 births
1902 deaths
People from Lübeck
British cartographers